The Parish Church of Saint John the Baptist,  commonly known as the Dingle Church, is a Roman Catholic parish church located at the municipality of Dingle, Iloilo in the Philippines. Finished in 1886, the church stands as one of the fine examples of Baroque architecture exuding the style of Neoclassical extravagance.

Construction

An Augustinian priest named Fr. Francisco Manuel Blanco founded Dingle, which was pre-colonial settlement in Simsiman, as a visita of Pototan in 1593. By August 16, 1850, Dingle has regained its long-term independence and was officially named a town by the order of Governor General Antonio de Urbiztondo. To solidify its ecclesiastical prominence, Fr. Fernando Llorente ordered the construction of the Church which began at 1865 and was completed a year later.

Like churches in Eastern Iloilo, the Church is built out of limestone quarried from nearby mountains. In the case of the Dingle Church, the stones that set its foundation came from the mountains of Bulabog Putian National Park, a network of caves and tunnels which eventually historically served as a hide-out of Visayan revolutionaries of the Katipunan. 

The Dingle Church is a classic example of Baroque architecture, characterized by its broad facade, simplistic niche and its sturdy, triangular-shaped pediment. Though it lacks the opulent lavishness of most churches, it is infused with the Neoclassical elaborate style of volute shaping the upper facade. Unlike the baroque churches of Ilocos, the pediment of Dingle Church is attached to the church itself but is heavily fortified by pilasters and multi-faceted columns. 

Baked bricks in the colour of cream lined up its interiors. Supporting the ornately carved ceiling is a line of slender Ionic columns standing across the room. The altar where the statue of St. John the Baptist stands is supported by a stonework of columns raised in a marble dais.

Gallery

See also
 Architecture of the Philippines
 Spanish Baroque architecture

References

Roman Catholic churches in Iloilo
Baroque architecture in the Philippines
Churches in the Roman Catholic Archdiocese of Jaro